Nebojša Pavlović (Serbian Cyrillic: Небојша Павловић; born 9 April 1981) is a former Serbian footballer who played as a defensive midfielder.

External links
 Profile at Playerhistory. 
 

1981 births
Living people
Footballers from Belgrade
Serbian footballers
Serbian expatriate footballers
FK Čukarički players
CSM Unirea Alba Iulia players
FK Rad players
K.A.A. Gent players
K.S.C. Lokeren Oost-Vlaanderen players
K.V. Kortrijk players
Belgian Pro League players
Expatriate footballers in Belgium
Liga I players
Expatriate footballers in Romania
Association football midfielders